WQHA (channel 25), branded on-air as Nueva Vida TV, is a Spanish-language religious television station licensed to Aguada, Puerto Rico. Founded in 1993, the station is owned and operated by New Life Broadcasting, making it a sister station to radio stations WNVM, WDNO & WNVE. The Licensee is Western New Life, Inc. WQHA's programming is also seen on translator station, W06DA-D, channel 6 in Aguada. The station broadcasts Christian music videos 24 hours a day.

WKHD-LD (channel 15) serves as a full-time translator of WQHA and covers all the entire western region.

Nueva Vida Christian Television Network
WQHA is the flagship station of the Nueva Vida Christian Television Network, it is simulcasting on Low-power television stations, WZNA-LD, channel 3.1 in Guaynabo, Puerto Rico, and WKHD-LD channel 15.1 in Mayaguez, Puerto Rico.  Both stations are owned by New Life Broadcasting's president, Juan Carlos Matos Barreto.

Digital television

Digital channels

WQHA subchannels
WQHA's digital signal is multiplexed:

W06DA-D subchannels
W06DA-D's digital signal is multiplexed:

WKHD-LD subchannels
WKHD-LD's digital signal is multiplexed:

Analog-to-digital conversion

On January 13, 2009, WQHA signed off its analog signal and completed its move to digital.

About Nueva Vida TV
OptimaVision starts as a video-streaming service. On November 14, 2013, OptimaVision launched WNTE-LD channel 36 in Mayaguez, now owned by Make TV Corporation, as a satellite of WVDO-LD. WVTE-LD Channel 3 followed on March 24, 2014. WQHA Channel 50 (formerly a repeater for WUJA) was sold for $29 million to Western New Life, Inc. on May 2, 2014, and became the third channel in the network. NCN Television moved its programming to digital subchannel 50.2. On January 1, 2018, OptimaVision rebrands itself as Zona TV. On August 1, the station is once again rebranded as Nueva Vida TV.

FCC Spectrum Auction and WQHA sale
In 2012, the Federal Communications Commission announced they were going to hold a voluntary Incentive Auction for a portion of the radio frequency spectrum that is currently used by Digital Television broadcasters across the country. WQHA's owner, New Life Broadcasting announced he would participate in the auction, since it was estimated the station would net somewhere in the range of US$127 Million, much more than it would be worth on the open market otherwise. Since that time the auction estimate has increased to somewhere between $95 and US$50 Million, with the auction currently scheduled to take place in early 2016.

References

External links

Television channels and stations established in 1993
Aguada, Puerto Rico
1993 establishments in Puerto Rico
Christian television stations in Puerto Rico